Yellow Contraband is a 1928 American silent thriller film directed by Leo D. Maloney and starring Maloney, Eileen Sedgwick and Noble Johnson.

Cast
 Leo D. Maloney as Leo McMahon / Blackie Harris 
 Eileen Sedgwick as Mazie 
 Noble Johnson as Li Wong Foo 
 Tom London as Drag Conners 
 Joe Rickson as Pierre Dufresne 
 Bob Burns as Sheriff 
 Vester Pegg as Dude McClain 
 Walter Patterson as Ice-house Joe 
 Bill Patton as Rawhide 
 Bud Osborne as Dope Runner 
 Frank Ellis as Dope Runner 
 Tom B. Forman as Dope Runner

References

Bibliography
 Munden, Kenneth White. The American Film Institute Catalog of Motion Pictures Produced in the United States, Part 1. University of California Press, 1997.

External links
 

1928 films
1920s thriller films
American thriller films
American black-and-white films
American silent feature films
1920s English-language films
Films directed by Leo D. Maloney
Pathé Exchange films
Silent thriller films
1920s American films